Rockaway Park is a neighborhood in the New York City borough of Queens. The area is on the Rockaway Peninsula, nestled between Jamaica Bay to the north and the Atlantic Ocean to the south. The neighborhood of Rockaway Beach lies on its eastern border while the community of Belle Harbor is situated on its western side. The neighborhood is part of Queens Community Board 14.

Character
The heavily Irish Rockaway Park has been called the "Irish Riviera". The 2000 United States Census showed that 36.0% of the population were of Irish ancestry in the ZCTA for ZIP Code 11694.  The Saint Patrick's Day parade in Rockaway is the second-largest St. Patrick's Day Parade in New York City, second only to New York City's Saint Patrick's Day Parade up Fifth Avenue in Manhattan.

The neighborhood is centered around Beach 116th Street, a two-block street that runs from Beach Channel Drive southward to Ocean Promenade. At the street's northern end is Tribute Park, which has a memorial to the 343 firefighters killed in the September 11 terrorist attacks, and at its southern tip is a memorial to the 265 victims of American Airlines Flight 587, which crashed nearby on November 12, 2001.

Transportation

The area is served by bus routes operated by MTA New York City Bus. The  bus runs the length of the Rockaway Peninsula. The  runs from Beach 54th Street in Arverne, over the Cross Bay Bridge via Cross Bay Boulevard to Woodhaven. The  runs from Beach 116th Street, over the Cross Bay Bridge via Cross Bay Boulevard to Woodside, and Woodside LIRR station and 61st Street subway station. The  runs from Beach 116th Street to the Flatbush Avenue – Brooklyn College subway station, and the Brooklyn College, in Brooklyn via the Marine Parkway-Gil Hodges Memorial Bridge and Flatbush Avenue. It goes through Belle Harbor, Neponsit, and Jacob Riis Park on the Rockaway Peninsula.

In August 2013, a stop was added at Brooklyn Army Terminal. The service was extended multiple times. finally ending on October 31, 2014. On May 1, 2017, NYC Ferry's Rockaway route started operations between Pier 11/Wall Street in Manhattan's Financial District and Beach 108th Street in Rockaway Park, with a stop at Brooklyn Army Terminal.

References 

Irish-American neighborhoods
Neighborhoods in Queens, New York
Neighborhoods in Rockaway, Queens
Populated coastal places in New York (state)